The Mrs. A.F. Rossi House in Boise, Idaho, is a one-story cottage in the Colonial Revival style with "proto-bungaloid" elements. The house was designed by Tourtellotte & Co. and constructed in 1906. Its prominent feature is an outset, left front center porch. In 1982, the house was added to the National Register of Historic Places.

Lola L. Lindsey and Alexander F. Rossi were married February 25, 1903, in Boise. Alexander Rossi was associated with W.H. Ridenbaugh in logging and lumber enterprises until 1908, and they owned the A.F. Rossi Company, a South Boise lumber mill. In 1905, sister and brother Adaline Bennett and Alex Rossi deeded property in South Boise to Lola Rossi, and on the lot a six-room cottage was constructed in 1906 according to plans drawn by Tourtellotte & Co. The Rossis may have occupied the house until 1926, when they moved to Idaho City and became proprietors of the Luna House hotel, named for original owner M.G. Luney. The hotel was identical in name to the Luna House in Lewiston, an early stagecoach stop in Idaho Territory.

Notes

References

External links

		
National Register of Historic Places in Boise, Idaho
Colonial Revival architecture in Idaho
Houses in Boise, Idaho
Houses completed in 1906
1906 establishments in Idaho